The Green E.6 was a British six-cylinder, water-cooled aero engine that first ran in 1911, it was designed by Gustavus Green and built by the Green Engine Co and Mirlees, Bickerton & Day of Stockport between August 1914 and December 1918.

Applications
Avro 504K
Avro 523A
Bass-Paterson flying boat
Cody Type V
Eastbourne Aviation Circuit biplane
Gnosspelius Hydro Tractor Biplane
Grahame-White Type X Charabanc
Royal Aircraft Factory F.E.2a
Short S.68 Seaplane
Sopwith Bat Boat
Sopwith Three-seater
Sopwith 1913 Circuit of Britain floatplane
Sopwith Type TT

Engines on display
A preserved Green E.6 engine is on public display at the Fleet Air Arm Museum, RNAS Yeovilton.

Specifications (E.6)

See also

References

Notes

Bibliography

 Gunston, Bill. World Encyclopaedia of Aero Engines. Cambridge, England. Patrick Stephens Limited, 1989. 
 Lumsden, Alec. British Piston Engines and their Aircraft. Marlborough, Wiltshire: Airlife Publishing, 2003. .

1910s aircraft piston engines
Green aircraft engines